The Moluccan owlet-nightjar (Aegotheles crinifrons), also known as the long-whiskered owlet-nightjar, is a species of bird in the family Aegothelidae. It is endemic to the northern Moluccas.

Its natural habitats are subtropical or tropical moist lowland forest and subtropical or tropical moist montane forest.

References

Moluccan owlet-nightjar
Birds of the Maluku Islands
Moluccan owlet-nightjar
Moluccan owlet-nightjar
Taxonomy articles created by Polbot